The Ho-Am Prize in Science was established in 1990 by Kun-Hee Lee, the Chairman of Samsung, to honour the late Chairman, Lee Byung-chul, the founder of the company. The Ho-Am Prize in Science (previously the Ho-Am Prize in Science & Technology) is one of six prizes awarded annually, covering the five categories of Science, Engineering, Medicine, Arts, and Community Service, plus a Special Prize, which are named after the late Chairman's sobriquet (art-name or pen name), Ho-Am.

The Ho-Am Prize in Science is presented each year, together with the other prizes, to individuals of Korean heritage who have furthered the welfare of humanity through distinguished accomplishments in the field of Science.

Prizewinners of Ho-Am Prize for Science
Source: Ho-Am Foundation

See also 

 List of general science and technology awards 
 Ho-Am Prize in Medicine
 Ho-Am Prize in the Arts
 Ho-Am Prize in Engineering
 Ho-Am Prize in Community Service

References

External links
Ho-Am Prize winners

Science and technology awards
Science and technology in South Korea
Awards established in 1991
South Korean awards
Samsung
Annual events in South Korea
1991 establishments in South Korea